The Battle of Tenango del Valle was a battle of the War of Mexican Independence that occurred in May 1812 on the outskirts of Tenango del Valle, State of Mexico. The battle was fought between the royalist forces loyal to the Spanish crown, and the Mexican rebels fighting for independence from the Spanish Empire.

The forces of the Mexican insurgents under the command of Ignacio López Rayón were able to successfully rout the forces loyal to the Spanish crown.

See also 
 Mexican War of Independence

References

Bibliography 
 

Tenango del Valle
Tenango del Valle
History of the State of Mexico
Tenango del Valle
Tenango del Valle
1812 in New Spain
May 1812 events